Jeanne Thérèse du Han de Martigny  (30 October 1707 in Lunéville – 7 May 1748 in Nancy) was born and baptized the same day in Lunéville, in the duchy of Lorraine, now part of France. She was the daughter of Philippe-Louis du Han, comte de Martigny (1678–1733) and his wife Catherine Françoise de Roquefeuil de Puydebar (c.1680 – 1764). The Du Han de Martigny were an important noble family of Lorraine, with estates in the north of the duchy.

Louis-Philippe held posts as conseiller d'état, Chamberlain and Grand Veneur under Duke Léopold I, and his daughters were among the court beauties. In 1731, Jeanne-Thérèse was maid of honour to the Dowager Duchess and Regent of Lorraine, Léopold's widow.

After the outbreak of the War of the Austrian Succession, Granville Elliott spent most of his time away fighting.

Jeanne Thérèse and her husband Granville appear regularly in the Madame de Graffigny correspondence.

Family
She married Granville Elliott, Count Elliott, on 15 March 1735, in Mannheim, but the couple lived in Lorraine after their marriage, where they had one daughter and six sons:

Marie Charlotte Elliott (23 May 1736 – 3 February 1785)
Stanislaus François Xavier Elliott (7 June 1737 – after 1752)
Amable Gaspard Antoine Elliott (4 September 1738 – 30 June 1814), 2nd Count Elliott
Charles Phillippe Elliott (1 December 1740 – unknown)
Paul Antoine Elliott (12 June 1741 – 25 July 1741)
François Maximillian Elliott (12 June 1741 – unknown)
Jean-Baptiste-François Elliott (25 June 1747 – unknown)

Jeanne Thérèse died in Nancy on 7 July 1748 and was buried two days later in the nave of the Notre-Dame cathedral church in Nancy. Her body was reburied when the church was demolished and rebuilt in the 1790s.

Because Granville returned to Britain and remarried, he published a will for Jeanne Therese at London.

Sources

1707 births
1748 deaths
People from Lunéville
Counts of Martigny
Lorraine nobility